Need for Speed: Underground 2 is a 2004 racing video game developed by EA Black Box and published by Electronic Arts. It is the eighth installment in the Need for Speed series and the direct sequel to Need for Speed: Underground. It was developed for Microsoft Windows, GameCube, PlayStation 2, and Xbox. Game Boy Advance and Nintendo DS versions were developed by Pocketeers, and a PlayStation Portable version, titled Need for Speed: Underground Rivals, was developed by Team Fusion. Another version for mobile phones was also developed. Like its predecessor, it was also commercially successful, selling around 11 million copies worldwide and breaking sales records in the United Kingdom.

The game entails tuning cars for street races, resuming the Need for Speed: Underground storyline. Need for Speed: Underground 2 provides several new features, such as broader customization, new methods of selecting races, set in a city known as Bayview. Brooke Burke is the voice of Rachel Teller, the person who guides the player throughout the game. The game's storyline is presented in a comic book strip. The Nintendo DS port introduces a new feature in which the player can design custom decals to adorn any vehicle in the game.

Plot
The story begins after the player has beaten Eddie and his street racing gang, "The Eastsiders", along with Melissa in Olympic City and is now revered as the best street racer in Olympic City. After a race, the player is called by an unidentified man with an "invitation" to join his team and that he "is not taking no for an answer". The player ends the call without answering and starts driving to a party but is ambushed by a Hummer H2 that rams his Nissan Skyline GT-R, wrecking it. A man with a scythe tattoo on his hand calls to confirm that he "took care of a problem".

Six months later, the player boards a plane to Bayview with a good luck note from Samantha that also refers to her friend, Rachel Teller. The player arrives in Bayview, buys his first car using the money provided by the insurance on his totaled Nissan Skyline, and starts racing again. The player soon gains fame and sponsorship deals from winning races and attracts the attention of "The Wraiths" and their leader, Caleb Reece. Caleb is revealed to be the driver of the Hummer that wrecked the player's car in Olympic City.

Rachel reveals to the player that Caleb is attempting to take control of the racing scene in Bayview by manipulating the sponsorship deals in his favor, threatening the player's livelihood, and Rachel's liaison with the sponsors. Caleb attempts to have the player lose an Underground Racing League tournament by placing Nikki Morris, a Wraith member, in the same tournament as the player. This ultimately fails, and Nikki leaves the Wraiths after Caleb berates her for losing; she then joins Rachel and the player's side. Nikki warns them of the consequences of Caleb's plan if he takes over the city's street racing scene.

Desperate to stop the player, Caleb eventually puts all of the remaining Wraiths members in an Underground Racing League tournament against the player, which fails and after losing another sponsor, Caleb challenges the player to a showdown. The player wins the race and celebrates with Rachel and Nikki while Caleb is left insolvent and defeated.

That event solidifies the player's status as the best Underground racer in Bayview.

Gameplay
 
Underground 2 is the first game in the series to feature an open world, where players can drive freely around and explore the city, unlocking areas by winning races. Racing modes are roughly similar to Underground; one racing mode was dropped, this being the Knockout competitions. A Lap Knockout option is available when racing Circuit in non-career races.

Circuit race is a standard race that involves up to four cars driving around a track that loops back to the start line of itself. A circuit race has typically a minimum of 2 laps to a maximum of 5 laps.
Sprint race is a point-to-point race involving a maximum of four vehicles.
Drifting is one of the technical aspects of Underground 2. On the "parkade" tracks, the player drifts with up to 3 other competitors at the same time on the parkade tracks. Points are awarded when the player successfully slides the car and finishes each drift without hitting any walls or traffic. No nitrous oxide is allowed. There are also downhill drift events where the player drifts the car while progressing down the course from top to bottom. In the downhill drifts, there are no other racers, but there is normal city traffic. Players increase their points by sliding past city cars.
Unlike Underground, time plays a crucial role here, especially in parkade tracks; if the opponents end up crossing the finish line way before the player, a 30-second timer will start within which the players will have to accumulate drift points until the timer runs out or they cross the finish line.

Drag racing is another technical aspect of the game; a straight-line race that forces players to use the manual transmission. Like Underground, steering in this mode is simplified to simply allow for lane changes, while the game handles the steering along the lanes. The HUD in this mode is enlarged and displayed on either side of the screen; emphasizing on monitoring them, especially the tachometer and the engine's temperature. The players' positions will get forfeited if they collide into traffic or barriers, or overheat their engine due to prolonged redlining.

Apart from these, four new race variations have also been provided in Underground 2:
Street X mode is similar to circuit races, except that they take place in closed and tight tracks. A maximum of 4 racers participates in this event. Like drift mode, this mode disables the use of nitrous oxide.
Underground Racing League (URL) is a set of tournaments that takes place in a specific set of closed tracks outside city streets - either actual racing circuits or airport runways. URL tournaments typically consist of one to three races, with up to six cars (both in career mode and online). In tournaments with two or more races, a points system is used. At the end of each race, drivers receive a specific number of points according to their standing in a race. The total score at the end of these races determines the winner of the tournament.
Special events - these are similar to sprints, intending to reach a target point on the map, which is a "photographer", and the player needs to reach the target within a specific time limit. Achieving this will reward the player with a magazine cover.
The player can choose when to initiate an outrun and can take any path and/or use tactics to achieve this goal, provided they are in the lead. Each stage, including stage 1, has a limited number of outruns a player can win. For example, in the intro stage where the player is driving Rachel's car, 3 outruns can be won. After winning the number of outruns allowed for a stage, the outrun opponent cars cease to appear. After completing a career, there is no limit to the number of outruns wins allowed. Depending on the stage, after winning some number of outruns, the player is rewarded with a unique part. Some stages allow a player to do a series of outrun sequences, rewarding the player with multiple unique parts (one for each series of outruns won). The outrun mode is similar to that of Tokyo Xtreme Racer and Wangan Midnight video games, which use health bars instead of distance to determine the winner.

The races are divided into 5 "stages". Once any stage is completed, the race locations of that stage will be replaced by the counterparts of the next stage. A "World Map" feature includes a menu of races for all prior stages, denoting races that have been completed and yet to be completed. After completing stage 2 through stage 5 (these stages require completing some number of "DVD" events), there will always be 8 sponsor races that will not be completed, since a player has to choose a single sponsor per stage and can only run 3 out of 11 unique sponsor races, leaving 8 sponsor races incomplete at the end of each stage. These can only be run using World Map. Due to a game bug (at least on the PC version), if running a non-completed race from the World Map, no credit (cash or rep) will be awarded unless the player restarts at least once after the race starts.

Underground 2 is unique in the Need for Speed series in the sense that it requires a player to drive to a certain place in the city to begin a race (other games allow the player to select a race from a menu). Most races are marked on the in-game radar, but some are hidden and the player must search for them, should they decide to play them. The following features aid the players in this regard:

Cell phone / SMS system - During gameplay, the players will occasionally receive phone calls or text messages. The game maintains a list of messages and game info that can be reviewed via a menu system.
Cash and info icons - Each stage, including the intro stage, includes a set of hovering icons scattered throughout the game world. As the player explores the map in free roam, the player receives a cash reward and/or info as the player discovers and drives through each of the icons.

Vehicles
As in Need for Speed: Underground, Underground 2 continues to offer similar vehicles for purchase and modification, most of which consist of Japanese models such as Nissan 240SX, Nissan Skyline R34, or Mitsubishi Eclipse, with some European and American models. Also, Underground 2 is the first game in the Need for Speed series to offer three SUVs as racing vehicles. Also, it is the second game in the Need for Speed series after Underground to offer a Korean-made car (Hyundai Tiburon) as a racing vehicle. There are two versions of the game, US and EU, where each version has 29 of 31 possible cars: the US version has an Acura RSX and a Honda Civic, while the EU version instead has a Peugeot 106 and a Vauxhall Corsa, the rest of the 27 cars in both versions are the same.

SUVs, also known as sport utility vehicles, were a new element added to Underground 2. The SUVs can be upgraded and tuned in the same manner as cars. Some of the events in career mode are SUV-only events and only appear when a player is driving an SUV. In career or any offline mode, if the player is driving an SUV, the computer opponents also drive SUVs, but after completing a stage, the World Map allows a player to run any event from prior stages in either a car or an SUV.

Customization
Customization in Underground 2 was significantly expanded compared to previous iterations from the series. Visual customization has expanded with the ability to customize the car's front and rear bumpers, side skirts, spoiler, hood, exhaust tips, doors, roof scoop, wheels (including the ability to put on spinners), headlights and taillights, side mirrors and paint. Vinyls and decals can also be added, as well as car stereos (speakers, amplifiers & subwoofers), hydraulics, nitrous bottles, and under glow neon. Most visual modifications to the car have no actual effect on vehicle performance. The sound systems, for example, could be put in the trunk of cars but served no purpose other than visual cues. Hydraulics can be used in combination with nitrous at a start of a race which can cause a car to do a wheelie and for some cars get a better launch. The performance and handling of the car are affected by cosmetic modifications, like spoilers and hoods, which affect the downforce of the car - better spoilers allow better tuning of the downforce management both in front and in the back of the vehicle. Visual upgrades increase a car's visual rating, up to a rating of 10.0. At least one car in a career garage needs to be visually upgraded to a 10.0 rating to unlock all 10 DVD events (completing these rewards the player with a DVD cover), and each stage has a required number of DVD events.

A car's performance can be enhanced by upgrading the car's engine, engine control unit (ECU), transmission, suspension, tires, brakes, reducing the car's weight, and adding a turbo and/or nitrous. The player has the ability to either upgrade the performance through upgrade packages or by purchasing individual parts of each performance category. Underground 2 also introduces a dyno-tuning system which allows players to specifically tune certain aspect of the car such as ECU, turbo, suspension springs, front and rear shock absorbers, gear ratios, aerodynamics, brake bias, individual tire grip, etc. The player can test the settings via a dyno run which will display a torque and power versus rpm graph, and an estimated 0–60 mph (0–100 km/h) time.

Multiplayer
Underground 2 had online multiplayer capability on PS2, PC, and Xbox, but by 2010, EA Games had shut down their servers, rendering the feature inoperable. The PC version has a multiplayer LAN mode, and multiplayer races over the internet can still be run using the games LAN mode and a virtual LAN (a virtual private network).

Soundtrack
Like its predecessor, the game features a licensed soundtrack by EA Trax. They're a mix of different genres ranging from rap, trance, electronica, and rock, performed by artists such as Chingy, Paul Van Dyk, Unwritten Law, Spiderbait (doing a cover of Ram Jam's Black Betty), Fluke, Queens of the Stone Age, as well as Snoop Dogg (who is best known for performing a remix of The Doors' Riders on the Storm that acts as the game's theme song). The hip hop songs are heard in the main menu, while the trance, electronica, and rock music are heard during race sequences.

Reception

Need for Speed: Underground 2 received positive reviews. GameRankings and Metacritic gave it a score of 86% for the Mobile version; 83.50% and 82 out of 100 for the PC version, 82.61% and 83 out of 100 for the Xbox version, 80.77% and 82 out of 100 for the PlayStation 2 version, 79.98% and 77 out of 100 for the GameCube version, 76.44% and 74 out of 100 for the PSP version, 69.45% and 72 out of 100 for the Game Boy Advance version and 65.44% and 65 out of 100 for the DS version.

The game was widely regarded as one of the best games of the series and is remembered for the quality of the gameplay, the length, the endless customization, the interesting side-missions, the graphics, and the addition of "Free Roam". However, some of its elements were criticized as well, such as having to drive excessive amounts to get to specific races, bland voice acting and strong product placement for companies with little to no connection to auto racing, such as integrating the logo for Cingular, an American wireless communications company that existed at the time, into the game's messaging system and displaying it on-screen for much of the gameplay. The GameCube version was also criticized for its unstable frame rate and inferior graphics, the hip-hop slang used by the characters during the story and in gameplay (such as calling the money "bank"), the comic book styled cutscenes, and lack of police also garnered criticism.

GameSpot gave the mobile phone version a score of 9.2 out of 10 and said that it "isn't just the best racing game ever made for a mobile phone; it's also a much-needed showcase for V Cast technology. This game boasts game length and replay value so many orders beyond the mobile norm that it calls for a total paradigm shift. Simply put, mobile gaming just got a much-needed kick up the evolutionary ladder." IGN gave the same version a score of eight out of ten and called it "a big step for mobile gaming, in my opinion. While there are things I did not like about the game -- loading and some control issues -- I cannot deny that this is one hell of a package. If you want a game that maxes out your 3D handset, Need for Speed Underground 2 is the game to get."

Detroit Free Press gave the Rivals version all four stars, exclaiming, "The racing here is just flat-out fun, with growling engines, jumps, and shortcuts that allow you to smash through fences. But there are thoughtful additions, including Party Play." The Sydney Morning Herald, however, gave the Rivals version three-and-a-half stars out of five and said, "While not PSP's best driving game, Rivals is an entertaining street racer that offers quick thrills." On the other hand, the same newspaper gave the GameCube, PS2, PC, and Xbox versions a score of four stars out of five and said, "While the driving action isn't quite as satisfying as the superb Burnout 3, it's still strong enough to keep you playing through the 150 or so races." The Times also gave the game four stars out of five and stated, "The courses in this game are just as much the stars as the cars. The dazzling downtown locations are massive, dominated by skyscrapers whose light bathes the streets in a radiant glow."

Sales
According to Electronic Arts, Need for Speed: Underground 2 sold above 8.4 million units worldwide by the end of 2004. The PlayStation 2 version of Underground 2 received a "Double Platinum" sales award from the Entertainment and Leisure Software Publishers Association (ELSPA), indicating sales of at least 600,000 copies in the United Kingdom. The game ultimately sold around 11 million copies and entered the "best-sellers" of each console, PS2's Greatest Hits, Xbox's Platinum Hits, and GameCube's Player's Choice.

References

External links

2004 video games
Electronic Arts games
Game Boy Advance games
Game Boy Advance-only games
GameCube games
 08
Nintendo DS games
Open-world video games
Split-screen multiplayer games
PlayStation 2 games
PlayStation Portable games
Street racing video games
Video games developed in Canada
Video games scored by Allister Brimble
Video games scored by Tom Salta
Video game sequels
Video games set in the United States
Video games with alternative versions
Windows games
Xbox games